Glenachulish (: valley of the narrows; pronounced Glen – ah – hoolish) is a hamlet and glen which lie close to the village of Ballachulish in the Scottish Highlands.

Etymology
The name derives from the narrows in the sea loch, Loch Leven, where it joins Loch Linnhe.

Village
Glenachulish was a forestry village. The original houses there were built by the Forestry Commission in the mid 20th century. Subsequent house building has swelled the number of dwelling places, though the actual population probably peaked in the 1970s. While the original inhabitants came to work in the forestry (many of them, ironically, from Hebridean islands where few trees grow). The current population includes some who have moved to the area from Central Scotland and England.

Glen
The wooded Glenachulish is a setting, within the horseshoe of the popular Beinn a' Bheithir.

Footnotes

Populated places in Lochaber